Mostafa Malekian (born 1 June 1956 in Shahreza) is a prominent Iranian philosopher, thinker, translator and editor. He is working on a project called Rationality and Spirituality. His most important book, that is about spirituality and wisdom, is A Way to Freedom.

Malekian was formerly a professor of philosophy at Tehran University and Tarbiat Modares University.

See also 
Intellectual Movements in Iran
Iranian philosophy
Abdolkarim Soroush

External links 
 Mostafa Malekian: Spirituality, Siyasat-Zadegi and (A)political Self-Improvement, Eskandar Sadeghi-Boroujerdi, Digest of Middle East Studies, Volume 23, Issue 2, pp. 279–311, Fall 2014

Muslim reformers
21st-century Iranian philosophers
Iranian translators
Academic staff of the University of Tehran
Academic staff of Tarbiat Modares University
1956 births
Living people
Hermeneutists
University of Tabriz alumni
Iranian Shia scholars of Islam
Faculty of Theology and Islamic Studies of the University of Tehran alumni
20th-century Iranian philosophers